Nevada's 17th Senate district is one of 21 districts in the Nevada Senate. It has  been represented by Republican James Settelmeyer since 2010, succeeding fellow Republican Mark Amodei.

Geography
District 17 covers all of Churchill, Douglas, Lyon, and Storey Counties, including the communities of Fallon, East Valley, Gardnerville, Gardnerville Ranchos, Indian Hills, Johnson Lane, Kingsbury, Minden, Ruhenstroth, Topaz Ranch Estates, Fernley, Yerington, Dayton, Silver Springs, Smith Valley, Stagecoach, Stateline, and Virginia City.

The district overlaps with Nevada's 2nd and 4th congressional districts, and with the 38th and 39th districts of the Nevada Assembly. It borders the state of California.

Recent election results
Nevada Senators are elected to staggered four-year terms; since 2012 redistricting, the 17th district has held elections in midterm years.

2018

2014

2010

Federal and statewide results in District 17

References 

17
Churchill County, Nevada
Douglas County, Nevada
Lyon County, Nevada
Storey County, Nevada